Bracebridge Hall, or The Humorists, A Medley was written by Washington Irving in 1821, while he lived in England, and published in 1822. This episodic novel was originally published under his pseudonym Geoffrey Crayon.

Plot introduction
As this is a location-based series of character sketches, there are a number of individual plots. The tales centre on the occupants of an English manor (based on Aston Hall, near Birmingham, England, which was occupied by members of the Bracebridge family and which Irving visited).

Plot summary
As this is a series of character sketches, the most effective way currently to describe this book is to list the contents.

Volume I
 The Author
 The Hall
 The Busy Man
 Family Servants
 The Widow
 The Lovers
 Family Reliques
 An Old Soldier
 The Widow's Retinue
 Ready Money Jack
 Bachelors
 Wives
 Story Telling
 The Stout Gentleman
 Forest Trees
 A Literary Antiquary
 The Farm-House
 Horsemanship
 Love-Symptoms
 Falconry
 Hawking
 St. Mark's Eve
 Gentility
 Fortune Telling
 Love-Charms
 The Library
 The Student of Salamanca

Volume II
 English Country Gentleman
 A Bachelor's Confessions
 English Gravity
 Gipsies
 May-Day Customs
 Village Worthies
 The Schoolmaster
 The School
 A Village Politician
 The Rookery
 May-Day
 The Manuscript
 Annette Delarbre
 Travelling
 Popular Superstitions
 The Culprit
 Family Misfortunes
 Lovers' Troubles
 The Historian
 The Haunted House
 Dolph Heyliger
 The Storm-Ship
 The Wedding
 The Author's Farewell

Release details
All are hardcover editions except the 1823 and 1991 (binding unknown).
 1822, USA, C.S. Van Winkle, 2 volumes (May 21, 1822) – published by M&S Thomas, Philadelphia
 1822, UK, John Murray (May 23, 1822)
 1823, Berlin, German translation
 1836, USA, Carey, Lea and Blanchard, 2 volumes
 1865, USA, G.P. Putnam's Sons, complete in one volume, by Geoffrey Crayon, Gent.
 1869, USA, G.P. Putnam and Son
 1876 (dated 1877), London, Macmillan & Co., one volume edition, illustrated by Randolph Caldecott
 1890, London, Edinburgh & New York, T. Nelson and Sons
 1978, USA, Sleepy Hollow Restorations (October 1, 1978), 
 1990, USA, Ams Pr (June 1, 1990), 
 1991, USA, Library of America: Bracebridge Hall, Tales of a Traveller, The Alhambra (March 1, 1991),

References

External links
 
 Bracebridge Hall (Caldecott illustrated edition) at Google Books.
 

1822 short story collections
Short story collections by Washington Irving
Works published under a pseudonym